Minuscule 897 (in the Gregory-Aland numbering), ε 361 (von Soden), is a 13th-century Greek minuscule manuscript of the New Testament on parchment. It has marginalia. The manuscript has not survived in complete condition.

Description 

The codex contains the text of the four Gospels, on 327 parchment leaves (size ), with some lacunae. The text is written in one column per page, 17 lines per page. According to Hermann von Soden it has decorated headpieces and initials.

It lacks texts of Matthew 1:1-7:6; 27:63-18:7; Luke 22:36-47; 23:45-24:1; John 8:8:33-10:24 (12:18-14:21).

There is also a division according to the smaller Ammonian Sections (in Mark 239 sections, the last section in Mark 16:20), whose numbers are given at the margin. There are no references to the Eusebian Canons.

Text 
The Greek text of the codex is a representative of the Byzantine. Hermann von Soden classified it to the textual family Kr. Kurt Aland placed it in Category V.

According to the Claremont Profile Method, it represents the textual family Kr in Luke 1 and Luke 20 as perfect member. In Luke 10 no profile was made.

The text of the Pericope Adulterae (John 7:53-8:11) is marked at the margin with an obelus (÷) as a doubtful.

History 

According to C. R. Gregory, it was written in the 13th century. The manuscript is dated by the INTF to the 13th century. Of the history of the codex 897 nothing is known until the year 1869, when it was bought by David Laing. Gregory saw it in 1883.

The manuscript was added to the list of New Testament manuscripts by Gregory (897e). It was not on the Scrivener's list, but it was added to his list by Edward Miller in the 4th edition of A Plain Introduction to the Criticism of the New Testament.

It is not cited in critical editions of the Greek New Testament (UBS4, NA28).

The manuscript is housed at the Edinburgh University Library (Ms. 220 (D Laing 6)), in Edinburgh.

See also 

 List of New Testament minuscules (1–1000)
 Minuscule 922
 Minuscule 1187
 Biblical manuscript
 Textual criticism

References

Further reading

External links 
 

Greek New Testament minuscules
13th-century biblical manuscripts